Carlos Roberto Borja Baltazar (born January 18, 1988 in Orange, California) is an American former soccer player.

Career

Youth
Borja, who is of Mexican American descent, came up through the youth system of Cruz Azul, earning an invite after impressing at a tournament. He also spent time with the Irvine Strikers and at the Bradenton Academy.

Professional
In late July 2006 he was signed to a developmental contract by Chivas USA. He played for Mexican parent club Chivas Guadalajara's affiliate team CD Tapatio in the Primera División A, before returning to Chivas USA in 2010. He made his professional debut for Chivas on April 24, 2010 in a game against the San Jose Earthquakes. In 2011, he joined Los Angeles Blues and remained at the club for two years before returning to Chivas USA for the 2013 season.

References

External links
 

1988 births
Living people
Sportspeople from Orange, California
Soccer players from California
American soccer players
American sportspeople of Mexican descent
American expatriate soccer players
Cruz Azul footballers
Chivas USA players
Orange County SC players
Expatriate footballers in Mexico
Major League Soccer players
USL Championship players
United States men's youth international soccer players
United States men's under-20 international soccer players
Association football defenders
American expatriate sportspeople in Mexico